Balazuc is a commune in the Ardèche department in the Auvergne-Rhône-Alpes region of southern France.

The village has been labelled a "Village of Character" by the Departmental Committee of Tourism. It is a member of Les Plus Beaux Villages de France (The most beautiful villages in France) Association.

The inhabitants of the commune are known as Balazucains or Balazucaines.

Geography

Balazuc is located some 16 km south of Aubenas just east of Uzer. Aubenas Aerodrome is just north of the commune. Access to the commune is by the D579 road from Vogüé in the north which passes through the commune east of the village and continues to Pradons in the south. The D294 branches off the D579 in the commune and goes west to the village. Apart from the village there are also the hamlets of Servière, Translatour, Le Retourtier, and Les Louanes in the commune. The commune is forested in the west and east with large areas of farmland in the centre.

The Ardèche river flows through the commune and the village from north to south where it forms part of the southern border before continuing south to join the Rhône at Pont-Saint-Esprit. Numerous tributaries rise on both banks of the Ardèche and flow into the river including the Ruisseau de Mariou, the Ruisseau de Chadenas, the Ruisseau de Chastagnon, the Ruisseau de Tison, and the Ruisseau des Costes.

Neighbouring communes and villages

History
For millennia Balazuc has been the site of a ford on the Ardèche river which was a Gallic stronghold. The name Balazuc comes from the name Baladunum of bal meaning "rock" and "dunum" or "fortified height" in Gallic.

Balazuc has the remains of Neanderthal men who hunted ibex there over 50,000 years ago at the beginning of the last ice age. Farmers arrived in the Neolithic period around 3000 BC. to raise goats and sheep, cultivate the bottom of the depressions, and place their dead in mass graves in stone coffins.

In the Late Bronze Age, around 750 BC., the ford below the village was used. The Gauls, for whom there is no trace, gave it its name: Baladunum. The Gallo-Romans cultivated the Plain des Salles where the great Roman road passed between the Rhône and Nîmes. An early Christian sarcophagus has been found whose high reliefs include biblical scenes (a facsimile is displayed in the town hall). In the Middle Ages the village had a church and a castle from the 11th to 13th centuries in an enclosure which dates them. The castle was originally built in the 12th century and greatly enlarged in the 13th century with a square keep. The ramparts, keep, noble houses, and fortified houses are well preserved.

The village underwent an evolution of houses across the centuries but retained its originality and the medieval character of the village with its narrow streets and its "callades".

Pons de Balazuc, the son of Gérard de Balazuc, was one of the first known lords. He went on the first crusade and was killed just before the capture of Jerusalem in 1099 at the Siege of Arqa (at the archaeological site of Tel Arqa) near Tripoli (now in Lebanon).

Heraldry

Administration
List of Successive Mayors

Demography
In 2017 the commune had 377 inhabitants.

Culture and heritage

Civil heritage
A Chateau is registered as an historical monument.
The picturesque Medieval Village from the 11th and 13th centuries
A copy of the Balazuc sarcophagus, an early Christian sarcophagus from the end of the 4th or early 5th century found in the hamlet of Salles, visible under the Town Hall
A Fortified House from the 13th century
The Viel Audon village cooperative

Religious heritage
The Romanesque Church of Saint Madeleine (11th century). is registered as an historical monument. The windows of the Church are by the painter Jacques Yankel. The Church contains many items that are registered as historical objects:
2 Processional Crosses (19th century)
A Statue: Virgin Mary (19th century)
A Painting: Crucifixion (19th century)
The Dome of an old Tabernacle in the gallery (18th century)
A Statue: Virgin and child (19th century)
A Painting: Rosary (19th century)
A Statue: Virgin and child
A Funeral chapel in ruins from the 13th century
The Church of Saint Mary Magdelene from the late 19th century

Environmental heritage
The Barasses climbing site
The Ardèche Valley and the Gras de Chauzon are classified as a Zone naturelle d'intérêt écologique, faunistique et floristique (Natural area of ecological interest for flora and fauna).
The middle Ardèche Valley and its tributaries are classified as a Natura 2000 site of Community importance

Cultural events
The Roche-Haute Association since 1982 has organised concerts and exhibitions of paintings in the Romanesque church including paintings by: Guillaume Beaugé, Jacques Dromart, and Erik Levesque.

Balazuc Picture Gallery

Notable people linked to the commune
Guilhem de Balaun, Castellan of Balazuc and Occitan troubadour in the 13th century.
John M. Merriman, Professor of French History and Geography at Yale University (USA), has written a book on the History of Balazuc: The Stones of Balazuc (Norton Press).
Aimé Bocquet, pre-historian, in 2011 published a synthetic history of the village since ancient times focusing on life in the Middle Ages based on a tax document dated 1464: Balazuc, medieval village of Vivarais (Éditions Plumes d'Ardèche) .

See also
Communes of the Ardèche department

External links
Balazuc on Géoportail, National Geographic Institute (IGN) website 
Balazuc on the 1750 Cassini Map

References

Communes of Ardèche
Plus Beaux Villages de France